Viktoria Shliakhova (born 9 May 1981) is a Russian former pair skater. With partner Grigori Petrovski, she is the 1999 ISU Junior Grand Prix Final bronze medalist and a two-time Winter Universiade bronze medalist (1999, 2001). With earlier partner Alexander Maskov, she placed fourth at the 1995 World Junior Championships.

Programs 
(with Petrovski)

Results

With Petrovski

With Maskov

References 

1981 births
Russian female pair skaters
Living people
Sportspeople from Perm, Russia
Universiade medalists in figure skating
Universiade bronze medalists for Russia
Universiade silver medalists for Poland
Competitors at the 1999 Winter Universiade
Competitors at the 2001 Winter Universiade